Bryan Kelly Holcomb (born July 9, 1973) is a former American football quarterback of the National Football League. He was signed by the Tampa Bay Buccaneers as an undrafted free agent in 1995. He played college football at Middle Tennessee State. Holcomb was also a member of the Indianapolis Colts, Cleveland Browns, Buffalo Bills, Philadelphia Eagles and Minnesota Vikings.

Early years and family life
Holcomb attended Lincoln County High School in Fayetteville, Tennessee, and was a student and  lettered in football as a quarterback, baseball as a shortstop, and basketball and led his football team to the 1990 Tennessee State Championship.
He and his wife Lorie have 3 kids: Kellyn, Jalyn, and Jameson.

College career
Holcomb played college football at Middle Tennessee State University. During his freshman season in 1991, his near-perfect performance versus then No. 1 ranked Florida State at Doak Campbell Stadium versus a secondary that featured future NFL players Terrell Buckley and Clifton Abraham put him on the map. For the day, Holcomb completed 20 of 28 passes for 188 yards in his first college start.

He finally broke out statistically as a Senior, throwing for over 2,000 yards with 15 TD.

1991: 130/209 for 1,763 yards with 5 TD vs 4 INT.
1992: 92/168 for 1,409 yards with 9 TD vs 6 INT.
1993: 133/240 for 1,738 yards with 7 TD vs 6 INT.
1994: 146/244 for 2,154 yards with 15 TD vs 9 INT.

Professional career

World League of American Football
Holcomb was quarterback for the now-defunct Barcelona Dragons of World League of American Football in 1996.

Tampa Bay Buccaneers
Holcomb spent the 1995 season on the Buccaneers practice squad. He was released in 1996, as the Buccaneers opted to go with Scott Milanovich as the team's No. 3 quarterback.

Indianapolis Colts
Holcomb was signed by the Indianapolis Colts as a street free-agent in 1996. His first season he didn't play a regular season game. In 1997 a disappointing season, Holcomb played five games and started one in which he threw only one touchdown and eight interceptions. Holcomb never saw action in a regular season game for the Colts again.

Cleveland Browns
A backup to Peyton Manning of Indianapolis, Holcomb was cut in the 2000 off-season to be allowed to compete for the starting job with the Cleveland Browns, following Bruce Arians who left as the QB coach of the Colts to become the offensive coordinator of the Browns. The Browns had drafted Tim Couch with the number 1 pick in the 1999 draft. During their time in Cleveland, Holcomb occasionally outshined the former number one pick. In his first season as a Brown, Holcomb played in only one game which he completed seven of twelve passes for 114 yards and a passing touchdown. In Holcomb's second season he played in four games and started two games in which he threw eight touchdowns and four interceptions with 790 passing yards. In 2003, his third season, he had more playing time playing ten games and starting eight of them. He replaced Tim Couch as starting quarterback during that season. In that season he threw ten touchdowns and twelve interceptions and had a strong play-off performance in a loss to the Steelers where he threw for 429 yards and three touchdowns, nearly leading a late comeback to win the game. In his final season as a Brown Jeff Garcia replaced him as starting quarterback. Holcomb only played in four games and started two of them in which he threw seven touchdowns and five interceptions with 737 yards passing.

Buffalo Bills
Holcomb went to the Buffalo Bills before the 2005 season. He started half of the games in his first season as a Bill while J. P. Losman started the other half. Holcomb threw ten touchdowns and eight interceptions with 1,509 passing yards that season. In Holcomb's second and final season as a Bill he didn't play a regular season game the whole season.

Philadelphia Eagles
He was traded on March 26, 2007 to the Philadelphia Eagles with Takeo Spikes for Darwin Walker and a conditional 2008 draft pick, which the Bills would use to select Stevie Johnson. However, Holcomb never played a regular season game as an Eagle and was quickly traded.

Minnesota Vikings
On August 27, 2007, the Philadelphia Eagles traded Holcomb to the Minnesota Vikings for a sixth round pick in the 2009 NFL Draft. Holcomb played and started three games that season throwing two touchdowns and an interception with 515 passing yards. After the 2007 season, the Vikings then went on to release him on February 27, 2008.

Retirement
On July 7, 2008, it was announced that Holcomb would retire from the NFL.

Memorable moments
A Wild Card game against Pittsburgh in January 2003 saw Holcomb, playing for the Browns, become the third quarterback in playoff history to throw for more than 400 yards. He finished the game with 429 yards, a new postseason record for a regulation game.

Broadcasting career/post-playing career
In 2008, Holcomb joined his alma mater Middle Tennessee as the color commentator for the Blue Raider Radio Network. In addition, Holcomb has broadcast the TSSAA Blue Cross Bowl and was a broadcast member of the Music City Bowl Preview.

In February 2015, it was announced that Holcomb would be joining the coaching staff at Riverdale (Tenn.) HS, where he would be handling offensive coordinator duties.

References

External links
 NFL Europa bio

1973 births
Living people
American football quarterbacks
Middle Tennessee Blue Raiders football players
Barcelona Dragons players
Indianapolis Colts players
Cleveland Browns players
Buffalo Bills players
Minnesota Vikings players
Players of American football from Tennessee
People from Fayetteville, Tennessee